The Big Night Bathe (translit. Golyamoto noshtno kapane) is a 1980 Bulgarian drama film directed by Binka Zhelyazkova. It was screened in the Un Certain Regard section at the 1981 Cannes Film Festival.

Cast
 Yanina Kasheva - Ninel
 Małgorzata Braunek - Zana
 Tanya Shahova - Lora
 Lyuben Chatalov - Stoyan
 Ilia Karaivanov - Ivan
 Nikolai Sotirov - Sava
 Juozas Budraitis - Vili

References

External links

1980 films
1980s Bulgarian-language films
1980 drama films
Films directed by Binka Zhelyazkova
Bulgarian drama films